James Sugar is an American photographer, known for his work on National Geographic. He currently lives in Mill Valley, California.

National Geographic
He began his internship with Geographic in 1967, and was given a full-time contract in 1969. He covered more than 20 stories and worked on a number of books, until he finally left the society in 1992.

References

External links
Jim's personal website
National Geographic biography
SUMMER OF 69
“Summer of ‘69″-RTE revisits a National Geographic Article

American photographers
Commercial photographers
Living people
Year of birth missing (living people)